Chr. Augustinus Fabrikker ("Christian Augustinus Industries") is a former Danish tobacco company which now serves as the investment company of the Augustinus Foundation.

History
 
The company was founded by Ole Augustinus on 11 May 1750 when he established a tobacco factory on Frederiksborggade. A new building at Vestergade 8 was inaugurated in the 1770s. Augustinus three sons were all active in the venture. The eldest of them, Christian Augustinus, from whom it later took its name, took over the operations after their father's death in 1779. The building in Vestergade was destroyed in the Copenhagen Fire of 1795 but the current building at the site was completed a few years later.

A new tobacco factory on Gammel Kongevej in Frederiksberg was inaugurated in 1870.

The company established a tobacco factory at Gullandsgade  on Amager in 1914. The company later changed its name to Chr. Augustinus after it had been taken over by Ole Augustinus' son Christian Augustinus.

In 1919, Christian Augustinus established De Danske Cigar- & Tobaksfabrikker ("The Danish Cigar and Tobacco Factories") in a partnership with E. Nobel and A/S Horwitz & Kattentid but the company was changed to Chr. Augustinus Fabrikker after A/S Horwitz & Kattentid was bought out in 1933 and E. Nobel was bought out in 1938 although A/S De Danske Cigar- & Tobaksfabrikker was kept as a secondary name. The company acquired A/S Horwitz & Kattentid in 1949.

The Augustinus Foundation was established in 1942 at the initiative of Ludvig Augustinus. In 1861 Chr. Augustinus Fabrikker merged its tobacco-related activities with those of C.W. Obel and R. Færchs Fabrikker under the name Skandinavisk Tobakskompagni.

Headquarters
The company is headquartered at Sankt Annæ Plads 13 in central Copenhagen.

See also
 E. Nobel

Portfolio
Chr. Augustinus Fabrikker is a stakeholder in a number of prominent Danish companies:
 Skandinavisk Holding (100%)
 Gyldendal (27.5%)
 Jeudan (40.54%)
 Bang & Olufsen (>5%)
 Tivoli (25.4% and another 31.8% through Skandinavisk Holding)
 Kristeligt Dagblad (18.5%)
 Dansk Kapitalanlæg (8.65%)
 Royal Unibrew (10.40%)
 Skodsborg Sundhedscenter
 Ambu (8.30%)
 Monberg & Thorsen (10.1%)
 NNIT (10%)

References

External links
 Official website

Investment companies of Denmark
Tobacco companies of Denmark
Manufacturing companies based in Copenhagen
Danish companies established in 1750